Charmaine Li (born January 8, 1983) is an actress, model, business owner, and spokesperson in the Hong Kong entertainment industry. She had a decade-long career in TVB. Li now focuses on business development and movies.

Early life 
On 8 January 1983, Li was born in British Hong Kong.
Li graduated from Belilios Public School.

Education 
In 2004, Li graduated from School of Drama at The Hong Kong Academy of Performing Arts in Hong Kong.

Career 
From 2004 to 2014, Li worked under Television Broadcasts Limited.
After 2014, Li stopped acting to focus on business development. 

Li is a business woman. Li and her husband Ricky Fan co-invested in an online diamond business. Li and her husband also have business investments in a restaurant, bowling alley, and film production. Although invested in several business projects, she still takes the time to film movies.

Personal life 
On 8 December 2011, Li married Ricky Fan, an actor and DJ, in Guam. On 15 January 2012, they held their wedding banquet in Hong Kong.

Filmography

Films

Television

References

External links
 Charmaine Li at chinesemov.com
 
  (Sze-Yan Li)
 Charmaine Li Si-Yan at hkmdb.com
 Charmaine Li at TVB
 Charmaine Li at spcnet.tv

1983 births
Living people
Hong Kong television actresses
TVB actors
Alumni of The Hong Kong Academy for Performing Arts
21st-century Hong Kong actresses